Imre Kiss is the name of:

 Imre Kiss (New Zealand footballer) (fl. 1967)
 Imre Kiss (footballer born 1957), Hungarian footballer at the 1982 FIFA World Cup